Barnstable County is a county located in the U.S. state of Massachusetts.

Barnstable County may also refer to:

 Barnstable County Courthouse, a historic courthouse
 Barnstable County Jail and House of Correction, the former county jail for Barnstable County
 Barnstable County Correctional Facility, the current county jail for Barnstable County
 Barnstable County Hospital, a former hospital
 , a Newport class tank landing ship